This is a list giving breakdowns of the members serving in the European Parliament session from 2014 to 2019, following the 2014 election. For a full single list, see: List of members of the European Parliament 2014–2019.

MEPs
 List of members of the European Parliament for Austria, 2014–2019
 List of members of the European Parliament for Belgium, 2014–2019
 List of members of the European Parliament for Bulgaria, 2014–2019
 List of members of the European Parliament for Croatia, 2014–2019
 List of members of the European Parliament for Cyprus, 2014–2019
 List of members of the European Parliament for the Czech Republic, 2014–2019
 List of members of the European Parliament for Denmark, 2014–2019
 List of members of the European Parliament for Estonia, 2014–2019
 List of members of the European Parliament for Finland, 2014–2019
 List of members of the European Parliament for France, 2014–2019
 List of members of the European Parliament for Germany, 2014–2019
 List of members of the European Parliament for Greece, 2014–2019
 List of members of the European Parliament for Hungary, 2014–2019
 List of members of the European Parliament for Ireland, 2014–2019
 List of members of the European Parliament for Italy, 2014–2019
 List of members of the European Parliament for Latvia, 2014–2019
 List of members of the European Parliament for Lithuania, 2014–2019
 List of members of the European Parliament for Luxembourg, 2014–2019
 List of members of the European Parliament for Malta, 2014–2019
 List of members of the European Parliament for the Netherlands, 2014–2019
 List of members of the European Parliament for Poland, 2014–2019
 List of members of the European Parliament for Portugal, 2014–2019
 List of members of the European Parliament for Romania, 2014–2019
 List of members of the European Parliament for Slovakia, 2014–2019
 List of members of the European Parliament for Slovenia, 2014–2019
 List of members of the European Parliament for Spain, 2014–2019
 List of members of the European Parliament for Sweden, 2014–2019
 List of members of the European Parliament for the United Kingdom, 2014–2019 (including Gibraltar)